The pontine tegmentum, or dorsal pons, is located within the brainstem, and is one of two parts of the pons, the other being the ventral pons or basilar part of the pons. The pontine tegmentum can be defined in contrast to the basilar pons: basilar pons contains the corticospinal tract running craniocaudally and can be considered the rostral extension of the ventral medulla oblongata; however, basilar pons is distinguished from ventral medulla oblongata in that it contains additional transverse pontine fibres that continue laterally to become the middle cerebellar peduncle. The pontine tegmentum is all the material dorsal from the basilar pons to the fourth ventricle. Along with the dorsal surface of the medulla, it forms part of the rhomboid fossa – the floor of the fourth ventricle.

The pontine tegmentum contains nuclei of the cranial nerves (trigeminal (5th), abducens (6th), facial (7th), and vestibulocochlear (8th) cranial nerve nuclei) and their associated fibre tracts, the tegmental pontine reticular nucleus, the mesopontine cholinergic system comprising the pedunculopontine nucleus and the laterodorsal tegmental nucleus, and in the respiratory center the pontine respiratory group – the pneumotaxic centre and the apneustic centre. Nearby important structures include the cranial nerve nuclei of the oculomotor (3rd) and trochlear (4th) nerve nuclei, which are located in the midbrain, the pontine nuclei, which are located within the basilar pons, and the raphe nucleus and the locus ceruleus, nuclei of cranial nerves 9-12, and the dorsal respiratory group, which are located further caudally in the brainstem. The dorsal respiratory group are connected to the pneumotaxic and apneustic centres of the pontine tegmentum.

Function

Thanks to the number of different nuclei located within the pontine tegmentum, it is a region associated with a range of functions including sensory and motor functions (due to the cranial nuclei and fiber tracts), control of stages of sleep and levels of arousal and vigilance (due to the ascending cholinergic systems), and some aspects of respiratory control.

Functions of the cranial nerve nuclei
The pontine tegmentum contains nuclei of several cranial nerves and consequently has a role in several groups of sensory and motor processes.
 The principal sensory nucleus of the trigeminal nerve represents touch and position information of the head and face, but not the neck or back of the head, which are innervated by the cervical nerves. Pain and temperature information is also not represented within the principle nucleus, but rather in the spinal trigeminal nucleus, which is caudal to the pontine tegmentum in the medulla.
 The abducens nucleus controls abduction (outward rotation) of the eye.
 The facial motor nucleus and the superior salivary nucleus of the facial nerve are located within the pontine tegmentum. The facial motor nucleus serve motor control of the muscles of facial expression and the stapedius muscle of the ear, while the superior salivary nucleus controls the secretion of saliva and tears through parasympathetic innervation of structures including the lacrimal gland and the mucosal glands of the nose, palate, and pharynx. The facial solitary nucleus, which carries taste information from the anterior 2/3 of the tongue, is located caudal to the pontine tegmentum in the medulla.
 The superior vestibular nucleus, one of four vestibular nuclei, is located within the pons. The vestibular nuclei process information from the ear canals regarding the orientation and acceleration of the head. The remaining nuclei are located within the medulla. 
 The two divisions of the cochlear nucleus, which process auditory input from the cochlea, lie on the border of the pons and the medulla. Some of the fibers from the cochlear nerve cross over in the pontine tegmentum, forming the trapezoid body, which is thought to help sound localisation.

Functions of the mesopontine cholinergic system
The pontine tegmentum contains two predominately cholinergic nuclei, the pedunculopontine nucleus (PPN) and the laterodorsal tegmental nucleus, which project widely throughout the brain.

The PPN is involved in many functions, including arousal, attention, learning, reward, and voluntary limb movements and locomotion. While once thought important to the initiation of movement, recent research suggests a role in providing sensory feedback to the cerebral cortex. Recent research has discovered that the PPN is involved in the planning of movement, and that different networks of neurons in the PPN are switched on during real and imagined movement.

It is also implicated in the generation and maintenance of REM sleep. In animal studies, lesions of the pontine tegmentum greatly reduce or even eliminate REM sleep. Injection of a cholinergic agonist (e.g. carbachol), into the pontine tegmentum produces a state of REM sleep in cats. PET studies seem to indicate that there is a correlation between blood flow in the pontine tegmentum and REM sleep

Pontine waves, (PGO waves) or P-waves in rodents, are brain waves generated in the pontine tegmentum. They can be observed in mammals to precede the onset of REM sleep, and continue throughout its course. After periods of memory training, P-wave density increases during subsequent sleep periods in rats. This may be an indication of a link between sleep and learning.

Function of the respiratory group
The two respiratory areas – the pneumotaxic center and the apneustic center make up the pontine respiratory group that provide antagonistic control signals to the dorsal respiratory group (DRG) located in the medulla. Increased input from the pneumotaxic center decreases the duration and increases the frequency of bursts of activity in the DRG, producing shorter and more frequent inhalations. The apneustic center delays the end of a burst in the DRG, extending periods of inhalation.

See also
 Facial colliculus

References

External links
 

Neuroanatomy
Pons